James Y. Linden was an American college football coach. He served as the head coach at Loyola College of Los Angeles—now known as Loyola Marymount University—in 1921. He led Loyola to a 6–3–1 record.

Head coaching record

References

Year of birth missing
Year of death missing
Loyola Lions football coaches